The following outline is provided as an overview of and topical guide to Jamaica:

Jamaica – sovereign island nation located on the Island of Jamaica of the Greater Antilles archipelago in the Caribbean Sea. Its indigenous Arawakan-speaking Taíno inhabitants named the island Xaymaca, meaning the "Land of Wood and Water", or the "Land of Springs". Formerly a Spanish possession known as Santiago, it later became the British West Indies Crown colony of Jamaica. It is the third most populous anglophone country in the Americas, after the United States and Canada.

General reference 

 Pronunciation:
 Common English country name:  Jamaica
 Official English country name:  Jamaica
 Common endonym(s):  
 Official endonym(s):  
 Adjectival(s): Jamaican
 Demonym(s):
 Etymology: Name of Jamaica
 International rankings of Jamaica
 ISO country codes:  JM, JAM, 388
 ISO region codes:  See ISO 3166-2:JM
 Internet country code top-level domain:  .jm

Geography of Jamaica 

Geography of Jamaica
 Jamaica is...
 an island
 a country
 an island country
 a nation state
 a Commonwealth realm
 Location:
 Northern Hemisphere and Western Hemisphere
 North America (though not on the mainland)
 Atlantic Ocean
 North Atlantic
 Caribbean
 Antilles
 Greater Antilles
 Time zone:  UTC-05
 Extreme points of Jamaica
 High:  Blue Mountain Peak 
 Low:  Caribbean Sea 0 m
 Land boundaries:  none
 Coastline:  Caribbean Sea 1,022 km
 Population of Jamaica: 2,714,000 - UN Estimate 137th most populous country

 Area of Jamaica: 10,991 km² - 166th largest country
 Atlas of Jamaica

Environment of Jamaica 

 Climate of Jamaica
 Renewable energy in Jamaica
 Geology of Jamaica
 Protected areas of Jamaica
 Biosphere reserves in Jamaica
 National parks of Jamaica
 Wildlife of Jamaica
 Fauna of Jamaica
 Birds of Jamaica
 Mammals of Jamaica
 Effects of Hurricane Charley in Jamaica

Natural geographic features of Jamaica 
 Beaches of Jamaica
 Islands of Jamaica
 Lakes of Jamaica
 Mountains of Jamaica
 Volcanoes in Jamaica
 Rivers of Jamaica
 Waterfalls of Jamaica
 Valleys of Jamaica
 World Heritage Sites in Jamaica (none)

Regions of Jamaica 

Regions of Jamaica

Ecoregions of Jamaica 

List of ecoregions in Jamaica
 Ecoregions in Jamaica

Administrative divisions of Jamaica 

Administrative divisions of Jamaica
Administratively, Jamaica is divided into fourteen parishes. They are grouped into three historic counties, which have no administrative relevance (traditional capitals in parentheses):

Surrey (Kingston)yellow
Middlesex (Spanish Town)pink
Cornwall (Montego Bay)green

(1) The parishes of Kingston and Saint Andrew together form the Kingston and St. Andrew Corporation. 
(2) The parish of Kingston does not encompass all of the city of Kingston. Most of the city is in the parish of St. Andrew.

Municipalities of Jamaica 

Municipalities of Jamaica
 Capital of Jamaica: Kingston
 Cities, towns, villages and neighbourhoods of Jamaica

Demography of Jamaica 

Demographics of Jamaica

Government and politics of Jamaica 

Politics of Jamaica
 Form of government: parliamentary multi-party representative democratic constitutional monarchy
 Capital of Jamaica: Kingston
 Elections in Jamaica
 Political parties in Jamaica

Branches of the government of Jamaica 

Government of Jamaica

Executive branch of the government of Jamaica 
 Head of state: Charles III, King of Jamaica
 Governor General of Jamaica, the Monarch's representative
 Head of government: Andrew Holness, Prime Minister of Jamaica
 Cabinet of Jamaica

Legislative branch of the government of Jamaica 

 Parliament of Jamaica (bicameral)
 Upper house: Senate of Jamaica
 Lower house: House of Representatives of Jamaica

Judicial branch of the government of Jamaica 

Judiciary of Jamaica
 Supreme Court of Jamaica
 Court of Appeals of Jamaica
 Resident Magistrate's Courts of Jamaica
 Gun Court
 Commercial Court of Jamaica
 Petty Courts of Jamaica

Foreign relations of Jamaica 

Foreign relations of Jamaica
 Diplomatic missions in Jamaica
 Diplomatic missions of Jamaica

International organization membership 
Jamaica is a member of:

African, Caribbean, and Pacific Group of States (ACP)
Agency for the Prohibition of Nuclear Weapons in Latin America and the Caribbean (OPANAL)
Caribbean Community and Common Market (Caricom)
Caribbean Development Bank (CDB)
Commonwealth of Nations
Food and Agriculture Organization (FAO)
Group of 15 (G15)
Group of 77 (G77)
Inter-American Development Bank (IADB)
International Atomic Energy Agency (IAEA)
International Bank for Reconstruction and Development (IBRD)
International Civil Aviation Organization (ICAO)
International Criminal Court (ICCt) (signatory)
International Criminal Police Organization (Interpol)
International Federation of Red Cross and Red Crescent Societies (IFRCS)
International Finance Corporation (IFC)
International Fund for Agricultural Development (IFAD)
International Hydrographic Organization (IHO)
International Labour Organization (ILO)
International Maritime Organization (IMO)
International Monetary Fund (IMF)
International Olympic Committee (IOC)

International Organization for Migration (IOM)
International Organization for Standardization (ISO)
International Red Cross and Red Crescent Movement (ICRM)
International Telecommunication Union (ITU)
International Telecommunications Satellite Organization (ITSO)
Latin American Economic System (LAES)
Multilateral Investment Guarantee Agency (MIGA)
Nonaligned Movement (NAM)
Organisation for the Prohibition of Chemical Weapons (OPCW)
Organization of American States (OAS)
United Nations (UN)
United Nations Conference on Trade and Development (UNCTAD)
United Nations Educational, Scientific, and Cultural Organization (UNESCO)
United Nations Industrial Development Organization (UNIDO)
Universal Postal Union (UPU)
World Customs Organization (WCO)
World Federation of Trade Unions (WFTU)
World Health Organization (WHO)
World Intellectual Property Organization (WIPO)
World Meteorological Organization (WMO)
World Tourism Organization (UNWTO)
World Trade Organization (WTO)

Law and order in Jamaica 

Law of Jamaica
 Cannabis in Jamaica
 Capital punishment in Jamaica
 Constitution of Jamaica
 Crime in Jamaica
 Human rights in Jamaica
 LGBT rights in Jamaica
 Freedom of religion in Jamaica
 Law enforcement in Jamaica
 List of prisons in Jamaica

Military of Jamaica 

Military of Jamaica
 Command
 Commander-in-chief: Queen of Jamaica
 Ministry of Defence of Jamaica
 Forces
 Army of Jamaica
 Navy of Jamaica
 Air Force of Jamaica
 Special forces of Jamaica
 Military history of Jamaica
 Military ranks of Jamaica

Local government in Jamaica 

Local government in Jamaica

History of Jamaica 

History of Jamaica
Timeline of the history of Jamaica
Current events of Jamaica
 Military history of Jamaica

Culture of Jamaica 

Culture of Jamaica
 Architecture of Jamaica
Jamaican Georgian architecture
 Cuisine of Jamaica
 List of Jamaican dishes
 Festivals in Jamaica
 Languages of Jamaica
 Media in Jamaica
 National symbols of Jamaica
 Coat of arms of Jamaica
 Flag of Jamaica
 National anthem of Jamaica
 People of Jamaica
 Prostitution in Jamaica
 Public holidays in Jamaica
 Records of Jamaica
 Religion in Jamaica
 Christianity in Jamaica
 Hinduism in Jamaica
 Islam in Jamaica
 Judaism in Jamaica
 Sikhism in Jamaica
 List of museums in Jamaica
 List of National Heritage Sites in Jamaica
 World Heritage Sites in Jamaica(none)

Art in Jamaica 
 Art in Jamaica
 Cinema of Jamaica
 Literature of Jamaica
 Music of Jamaica
 Television in Jamaica
 Theatre in Jamaica

Sports in Jamaica 

Sports in Jamaica
 Football in Jamaica
Jamaica at the Olympics

Economy and infrastructure of Jamaica 

Economy of Jamaica
 Economic rank, by nominal GDP (2007): 110th (one hundred and tenth)
 Agriculture in Jamaica
 Banking in Jamaica
 National Bank of Jamaica
 Communications in Jamaica
 Internet in Jamaica
 Companies of Jamaica
Currency of Jamaica: Dollar
ISO 4217: JMD
 Energy in Jamaica
 Energy policy of Jamaica
 Oil industry in Jamaica
 Mining in Jamaica
 Tourism in Jamaica
 Transport in Jamaica
 Jamaica Stock Exchange

Education in Jamaica 

Education in Jamaica
List of schools in Jamaica
List of colleges in Jamaica
List of universities in Jamaica

Infrastructure of Jamaica
 Health care in Jamaica
 Transportation in Jamaica
 Airports in Jamaica
 Rail transport in Jamaica
 List of railway lines of Jamaica
 List of railway stations in Jamaica
 Roads in Jamaica
 Water transport in Jamaica
 List of lighthouses in Jamaica
 Water supply and sanitation in Jamaica
 Water resources management in Jamaica

See also 

Jamaica
Index of Jamaica-related articles
List of Jamaica-related topics
List of international rankings
Member state of the Commonwealth of Nations
Member state of the United Nations
Monarchy of Jamaica
Outline of geography
Outline of North America

References

External links 

 Official website of Queen Elizabeth as Queen of Jamaica
 Official website of the Jamaica Information Service
 The Cabinet Office of the Government of Jamaica

 National Library of Jamaica materials in the Digital Library of the Caribbean
 
 
 
 Jamaica. The World Factbook. Central Intelligence Agency.
 Jamaica Environment Trust

Jamaica